The Electoral Commission of Namibia (ECN) is an agency of the Government of Namibia. It was founded in 1992 under the Electoral Act 24 of 1992. The aim of the commission is to oversee all Namibian electoral activities starting from voter registration and political party registration, to the setting and monitoring of elections, counting of ballots and making results available.
 
The ECN is composed of a chairperson and four commissioners. Candidates are shortlisted by a committee consisting of the Chief Justice, a lawyer suggested by the Law Society and a representative from the Office of the Ombudsman. The President of Namibia then appoints the ECN from this shortlist for a five-year term.

The current Chief Electoral and Referenda Officer is Theo Mujoro since September 2018 and the chairperson of ECN is Advocate Notemba Tjipueja since August 2011.

See also
 Politics of Namibia
 List of political parties in Namibia

External links
 Official web site

References

1992 establishments in Namibia
Namibia
Government of Namibia
Elections in Namibia